The marbled honeyeater (Pycnopygius cinereus) is a species of bird in the family Meliphagidae.

Distribution and habitat
It is found in Indonesia and Papua New Guinea.  Its natural habitats are subtropical or tropical moist lowland forests and subtropical or tropical moist montane forests.

References

Pycnopygius
Birds described in 1873
Taxonomy articles created by Polbot